Siedlce  is a village in the administrative district of Gmina Oława, Oława County, Lower Silesian Voivodeship, Poland. Prior to 1945 it was in Germany.

References

Villages in Oława County